Jitendra Mishra is an Indian film producer and promoter, born in Titlagarh, Odisha. He is known for The Last Color, Desires of the Heart and Human OAK the only Indo-Italian film co-produced during Covid-19 lockdown.

Early life 
He was born in Titlagarh, a small town in Western Odisha to Radha Madhab Mishra and Saudamini Mishra. Jitendra is the youngest of six siblings. In 2000 he graduated in Law from Balangir Law College and did his Masters in Commerce from Rajendra College Balangir, Sambalpur University and went to Delhi.

Career 
Jitendra started his career as a production manager in a Delhi-based production house and after two years he founded his own production house in 2002. He was the associate producer of I Am Kalam. His recent production The Last Color by Michelin Star Chef Vikas Khanna premiered at the 30th Palm Springs International Film Festival and has been shown in various other festivals worldwide. His filmography includes Hollywood film Desires of the Heart (2013 film) produced by Solila Parida, directed by James Kicklighter, starring Val Lauren and Alicia Minshew, Buried Seeds , Maiya , Bhor and Aasma among others. Jitendra Mishra has designed and implemented several international festivals, workshops and campaigns including North East Film festival in all the 8 North East States of India and Meghalaya Film Festival, for Children’s Film Society India in association with Smile Foundation. He is the festival director of the film festival siffcy which he has designed for Smile Foundation, he was elected President (2020-22) of the global network of films for young people CIFEJ formed under the auspices of UNESCO in 1955. He has been a Member of Producers Network - Marche Du Films at Cannes Film Festival since 2013 and invited as a jury member to more than 50 international film festivals so far.

Production, distribution & promotion

Filmography

Major Honors and recognition

References

External links 

 https://siffcy.org/
 https://timesofindia.indiatimes.com/entertainment/english/hollywood/news/short-film-inspired-by-the-pandemic-explores-human-beings-and-their-relationships/articleshow/78408721.cms

Film producers from Odisha
Living people
People from Balangir district
Sambalpur University alumni
Year of birth missing (living people)